Tomer Ben Haim (born 2 January 1988) is an Israeli footballer who plays as a midfielder. He plays for Hapoel Azor.

Honours as a player 
 Hapoel Marmorek
Toto Cup For the third league: 2008–09
Maccabi Ironi Ashdod
Liga Bet: 2018–19

External links
 Tomer Ben Haim, At the Israel Football Association site (He)
 Tomer Ben Haim, At the Hapoel Petah Tikva Museum (He)
 Not stopping: Tomer Ben Haim signed with Maccabi Ironi Ashdod,  At the doublepass site (He)

References

1988 births
Israeli Jews
Living people
Israeli footballers
Gadna Tel Aviv Yehuda F.C. players
Hapoel Marmorek F.C. players
Hapoel Petah Tikva F.C. players
Sektzia Ness Ziona F.C. players
Hapoel Nir Ramat HaSharon F.C. players
Maccabi Yavne F.C. players
F.C. Kafr Qasim players
Maccabi Ironi Ashdod F.C. players
Hapoel Kiryat Ono F.C. players
Hapoel Azor F.C. players
Israeli Premier League players
Liga Leumit players
Association football midfielders